The Dynasty IT was a Canadian electric car produced by Dynasty Electric Car Corporation, designed to qualify as a neighborhood electric vehicle, primarily made for urban, recreational and light commercial markets.  It was available in five variants including a sedan, mini pick-up, van and two open air versions. The North American version has a range of up to 30 miles (50 km) and does not exceed 25 mph (40 km/h). Most models have a curb weight of 1450 lb (653 kg).

Dynasty was bought by Karakoram Motors of Pakistan, which in 2018 said it planned to produce it in Pakistan.

Use of the vehicle was legal as a low-speed vehicle (LSV) in 47 US states and the  Canadian province of British Columbia. A version of the car appeared on the American Sci-Fi Channel TV series Eureka. For the show's purposes, it is covered with photovoltaic cells to appear to be a solar-powered car.

Gallery

References

External links 

 Dynasty Electric Car Corp.

Electric car models
Canadian brands